Marinula is a genus of small air-breathing land snails, terrestrial pulmonate gastropod molluscs in the family Ellobiidae.

This genus is found in New Zealand.

Species
Species within the genus Marinula include:
 Marinula acuta (d'Orbigny, 1835)
 Marinula concinna (C. B. Adams, 1852)
 Marinula filholi Hutton, 1878
 Marinula juanensis
 Marinula maindroni Vélain, 1877
 Marinula parva (Swainson, 1855)
 Marinula pepita King, 1832
 Marinula rhoadsi Pilsbry, 1910
 Marinula striata Odhner, 1924
 Marinula tristanensis Connolly, 1915 
 Marinula velaini Connolly, 1915
 Marinula xanthostoma
Species brought into synonymy
 Subgenus Marinula (Monica) H. Adams & A. Adams, 1855: synonym of Ovatella Bivona-Bernardi, 1832
 Marinula affinis (Férussac, 1821): synonym of Pedipes affinis Férussac, 1821
 Marinula chathamensis Finlay, 1928: synonym of Marinula filholi Hutton, 1878

References

 King, P.P. (1832) Description of the Cirrhipeda, Conchifera and Mollusca, in a collection formed by the officers of H.M.S. Adventure and Beagle employed between the years 1826 and 1830 in surveying the southern coasts of South America, including the Straits of Magalhaens and the coast of Tierra del Fuego. Zoological Journal, 5: 332-349
 Powell A. W. B., New Zealand Mollusca, William Collins Publishers Ltd, Auckland, New Zealand 1979 

Ellobiidae
Gastropods of New Zealand